The Natchez District was one of two areas established in the Kingdom of Great Britain's West Florida colony during the 1770sthe other being the Tombigbee District. The first Anglo settlers in the district came primarily from other parts of British America. The district was recognized to be the area east of the Mississippi River from Bayou Sara in the south (presently St. Francisville, Louisiana) and Bayou Pierre in the north (presently Port Gibson, Mississippi).

It became a center of wealth in the antebellum years, as a trading center for slaves and cotton, and the center of cotton culture in the Old Southwest. Today, this area corresponds roughly with and includes most of the lands south of Interstate 20 and west of Interstate 55 in the state of Mississippi, in the southwest corner of the state.

After the United States made the Louisiana Purchase in 1803 of large territories formerly controlled by France west of the Mississippi River, the lowlying delta area on the west side of the river became considered part of the Natchez District. Several parishes were developed for plantation cotton cultivation here in the antebellum era, unlike southern Louisiana, where sugar cane was the dominant commodity crop. The Louisiana Natchez District included the parishes of Carroll (split between East Carroll and West Carroll in 1877), Concordia, Madison and Tensas.

History

Origins

The district was the home of the Natchez and other people, before Europeans arrived.

Prior to its development in the late 18th century, this area had been known to Europeans for many years, primarily French explorers and colonists. The French explorer Pierre Le Moyne d'Iberville had passed through the area in 1699 and had christened both the Amité and the Tangipahoa rivers. In the early 18th century, settlers from Louisiana began to introduce African slaves and the plantation system to the area. The first important plantation crop was tobacco.

In 1774, Great Britain enlarged the boundaries of the West Florida colony—established in 1763 from territory along the northern Gulf of Mexico coast taken from France and Spain following the French and Indian War (the Seven Years' War)—from the 31st parallel north to 32° 22′ north. By 1776, a sizable colony of English-speaking planters had settled there. The area nearest the Mississippi River was developed first, as it had important transportation access via the river. Later, as a riverport, cotton and slave market, it became the wealthiest area in the antebellum South.

At the end of the American Revolutionary War, Great Britain ceded West Florida to Spain as part of the 1783 Treaty of Paris. When this transaction was made however, West Florida's boundaries, which had changed while under British sovereignty, were not specified. As a result of this omission, control of the region was claimed by both Spain and the United States; resulting in a dispute commonly referred to as the West Florida Controversy. Spain claimed sovereignty over the region south of boundary established for West Florida by the British in 1774. The U.S. claimed that Spain had regained only the territory transferred to Great Britain in 1763that laying south of the 31st parallel. In 1784, the Spanish closed New Orleans and the Mississippi River Delta, which they controlled, to American goods coming down the Mississippi.

After several years of negotiations, Spain and the United States signed a treaty of friendship October 27, 1795. Commonly called Pinckney's Treaty, the agreement defined the border between the United States and Spanish Florida, and guaranteed the United States navigation rights on the Mississippi River, and the right to transfer goods without paying cargo fees (right of deposit) when they transferred goods from one ship to another at the Port of New Orleans. Nine months later, on August 3, 1796, the U.S. officially took possession of the region. Then, on April 7, 1798, the United States Congress established the Mississippi Territory (comprising both the Natchez and Tombigbee districts), with Natchez as its first capital.

Cotton boom
Eli Whitney’s development of the cotton gin in the late 18th century contributed to the development of the area, and the Deep South as a whole, as it made mechanized processing of short-staple cotton profitable. This type of cotton was better suited to the upland areas of the Deep South. Planters in the Natchez District became very wealthy by converting their tobacco plantations to cotton, for which there was a large market between 1785 and 1800. The rich loess soils proved very fertile for cotton cultivation. The planters developed new, more productive strains of cotton, improved cotton gins, and developed a large-scale system dependent upon both machinery and large numbers of slaves.

Their model was expanded in the antebellum South, creating such a demand for slaves that more than one million were transported from the Upper South in the domestic slave trade. They were brought overland, by riverboat, and by ocean-going ships to New Orleans. This forced migration broke up families and transplanted a large new African-descended population (with also European and Native American ancestry among many) to the area. The Deep South developed as a strong center of African-American culture.

Many cotton planters became so wealthy that they acquired thousands of acres and hundreds of African American slaves to work the lands. They built elegant mansions in and around the town of Natchez, and they hired overseers to manage their plantations in the countryside. Stephen Duncan (1787-1867) of Mississippi was reported to have owned more than 1,000 slaves, making him the richest cotton planter in the world at the time.

In 1806, an improved Mexican variety of cotton made the commodity crop even more profitable. The Mexican variety was crossed with the older black-seeded species to make improved varieties that made the state of Mississippi famous. The most noted cotton varieties (Belle Creole, Jethro, Parker, and Petit Gulf) were bred in Mississippi.

In 1803 the United States had made the Louisiana Purchase, acquiring vast territories west of the Mississippi River. The lowlying delta area west of the river across from Natchez also became informally considered part of the Natchez District. Unlike southern Louisiana, which was devoted to sugar cane cultivation, this area was developed for cotton plantations. When organized, the parishes included Carroll Parish, Louisiana (split between East Carroll and West Carroll in 1877), Concordia, Madison and Tensas. Following the American Civil War, African Americans here joined the Republican Party, as did others in the state. They were severely suppressed after Reconstruction. For example, whites allowed no black voters in East Carroll Parish, which was majority black, until a federal judge registered some in 1962.

The cotton boom of the early 19th century spread across the South from two primary cultural hearths: coastal South Carolina and the Natchez District. Cotton plantations were developed throughout the Southeast. In the Carolinas, Georgia, and Alabama, the cotton-growing areas became known as the Black Belt. From Natchez, the cotton plantation system spread north into the Mississippi embayment region, and west along the rivers of Louisiana, Arkansas, and Texas. In the antebellum years, nearly all plantations were developed with frontage on a river, for transportation.

The U.S. government recognized the strategic importance of Natchez early on, and as the city developed as a primary cotton port, Congress financed the building and improvement of roads leading to it. The U.S. Army widened the Natchez Trace, which connected the region to Nashville, Tennessee, in order to accommodate wagons. The road was placed under the oversight of the Postmaster General of the United States, making it one of the earliest national highways.

See also
West Florida
Battle of Baton Rouge (1779)
Fort Rosalie
History of Mississippi

References

Further reading

 Aaron D. Anderson, Builders of a New South: Merchants, Capital, and the Remaking of Natchez, 1865-1914. Jackson, MS: University Press of Mississippi, 2013.

Regions of Mississippi
Natchez Trace
History of Mississippi
Regions of Louisiana
History of Louisiana